Shasta Union High School District is a high school district in Redding, California. It serves all the high schools in Redding and its surrounding areas. Shasta Union High School District was first established in 1899.

On May 6, 2009, a county court judge ruled that Shasta Union High School District had to stop drug testing of students in non-athletic extracurricular activities, such as school band and debate club.

Jim Cloney, former Assistant Superintendent and Foothill High School principal is the current superintendent, this is his 9th year in the job. Milan Wollard, the former longtime (16 year) principal at Shasta High School is in his 1st year as Associate Superintendent, having replaced T. Kyle Turner. The third primary administrator is Dana Reginato, who like Cloney, is also in her 9th year on the job.

Schools

Current high schools
Enterprise High School
Foothill High School
Shasta High School
University Preparatory School

Other active schools

Shasta Adult School
Freedom High School (Community Day)
Pioneer High School (Continuation)
Northstate Independence High School (Independent Study)
Shasta Home School

Defunct schools
 Bishop Quinn High School
 Nova High School

References 

About Us. Shasta Union High School District. Retrieved on 2008-02-21.
Schools & Programs. Shasta Union High School District. Retrieved on 2008-02-21.

External links
 

School districts established in 1899
Redding, California
School districts in Shasta County, California
Buildings and structures in Redding, California
1899 establishments in California